The Building Owners and Managers Association (BOMA International), founded in 1907, is a professional organization for commercial real estate professionals based in the United States and Canada. Its membership includes building owners, managers, developers, leasing professionals, corporate facility managers, asset managers, and the providers of the products and services needed to operate commercial properties and it publishes The BOMA magazine.  BOMA's U.S. membership represents a combined total of nearly 10.4 billion square feet of office property that supports approximately 1.8 million jobs.

Purposes
Advocacy is key function of BOMA International staff who monitor and lobby pertinent legislative, regulatory and codes/standards issues, including electricity deregulation, capital gains tax relief, telecommunications, indoor air quality, private property rights, risk assessment, and codes and standards.  BOMA International has been working towards securing goals in capital gains tax relief, terrorism insurance extensions and energy efficiency tax deductions.

Publications and standards
BOMA International has several publications to communicate various topics to its members, including The BOMA Magazine, the official publication of BOMA International; the Experience Exchange Report, a compilation of income and expense data for office buildings across North America reporting on over 1 billion square feet of office space and the industry benchmark for more than 85 years; as well as several “how-to” guidebooks with information on everything from writing a commercial real estate lease to standard methods for measuring floor area.

 The BOMA Method for the Measurement of Buildings has become an international standard for determining the dimensions of buildings.  Architects find this method of area analysis to be easy to use for measuring rentable and usable square footage.

International affiliates
International Affiliates who operate for BOMA International in other countries outside of the US are listed below:
Australia (Property Council of Australia)
Brazil (Associacao Brasileira das Empresas do Mercado Imobiliario (ANMI))
Canada (BOMA/Canada)
China (China Office Building Owners and Managers Association (COBOMA))
Finland (Finnish Association of Building Owners and Construction Clients (RAKLI))
Greece (Greek Green Building Council)
Indonesia (BOMA Indonesia)
Japan (Japan Building Owners and Managers Association (BOMA Japan))
Korea (Korea Building Owners and Managers Association (KBOMA))
Mexico (BOMA Mexico, Instituto Mexicano del Edificio Inteligente y Sustentable, A.C. (IMEI))
New Zealand (Property Council New Zealand)
Panama (Associacion de Propietarios de Inemuebles (API))
The Philippines (BOMA of the Philippines, Inc. (BOMAP) & Philippine Association of Building Administration, Inc. (PABA))
Russia (Guild of Property Managers and Developers (GMD))
South Africa (South African Property Owners Association (SAPOA))
United Kingdom (British Council for Offices (BCO)) 

Each affiliate may pursue initiatives unique to their respective nation independent of BOMA International such as BOMA Canada's BOMA BESt program

Conferences
Each summer BOMA International hosts its Annual Conference and The Office Building Show.  

In January, BOMA International sponsors a Winter Business Meeting and in the spring hosts the National Issues Conference.

Professional certifications
 BOMI offers the following professional certifications / credentials for real estate professionals:

References

External links
 Official website

Real estate-related professional associations
Real estate industry trade groups